Battle of Bull Run used by the Union or the Battle of Manassas used by the Confederacy, which may refer to two conflicts during the American Civil War:

First Battle of Bull Run, July 21, 1861
Second Battle of Bull Run, August 28–30, 1862

See also
Manassas National Battlefield Park, location of the two conflicts in Prince William County, Virginia
 The Battle of Bull Run (film), 1913 film directed by Francis Ford
 Blind Tom Wiggins, whose compositions include The Battle of Manassas